The Royal Yugoslav Guards Battalion was an infantry formation of the Yugoslav Army Outside the Homeland in World War II. 

Formed in Cairo in 1941 as the 1st Battalion, Royal Yugoslav Guards, it consisted of Yugoslav soldiers who escaped capture during the April War and Slovene and Croatian prisoners of war of the Royal Italian Army. It was attached to the 4th Indian Division and saw service in the Western Desert Campaign until the unit's transfer to Mandatory Palestine in 1943. In June 1943, the unit was reassigned to the 10th Indian Division. 

The battalion was subject to significant internal strife upon its transfer to Palestine, with many soldiers demanding transfer to fight for the Yugoslav Partisans in their homeland. The unit was ultimately disbanded in May 1944. The majority of men transferred to the Partisans, though some remained in service with the British Army.

See also
Sacred Band
Balkan Air Force
Greek Armed Forces in the Middle East

References

Yugoslavia in World War II
Military units and formations established in 1941
Military units and formations disestablished in 1944
Military units and formations of the United Kingdom in World War II